Trenton Historic District may refer to:

Trenton Historic District (Trenton, North Carolina), listed on the National Register of Historic Places in Jones County, North Carolina
Trenton Historic District (Trenton, Tennessee), listed on the National Register of Historic Places in Gibson County, Tennessee

See also
Trenton (disambiguation)